S3, S-3 or S03 may refer to:

Entertainment
 Si3 (flim), originally titled S III and also known as Singam 3, the third film in the Singam franchise
 Expedition to the Barrier Peaks, code S3, a 1980 Dungeons & Dragons adventure module
 S3 Plan, a fictitious program in the Metal Gear Solid 2: Sons of Liberty video game
SABC 3, South African public television channel, stylised as S3

Transportation

Airlines
 Ashland Municipal Airport, FAA Location identifier S03, in Oregon, US
 SBA Airlines, IATA code S3, based in Caracas, Venezuela

Locomotives
 ALCO S-3, an American diesel switching (shunting) locomotive; see ALCO S-1 and S-3
 NER Class S3, a North Eastern Railway steam locomotive class
 Prussian S 3, a steam locomotive

Rail lines
 S3 (Berlin), an S-Bahn line
 S3 (Munich), an S-Bahn line in Bavaria, Germany
 S3 (Nuremberg), an S-Bahn line in Bavaria, Germany
 S3 (RER Vaud), an S-Bahn line in Switzerland
 S3 (Rhine-Main S-Bahn), an S-Bahn line in Frankfurt Rhine-Main, Germany
 S3 (Rhine-Ruhr S-Bahn), an S-Bahn line in North Rhine-Westphalia, Germany
 S3 (St. Gallen S-Bahn), an S-Bahn line in Switzerland
 S3 (ZVV), a line of the S-Bahn Zürich in Switzerland
 Line S3 (Milan suburban railway service), an Italian commuter rail route
 S3, a Dresden S-Bahn line
 S3, a Hamburg S-Bahn line
 S3, a Hanover S-Bahn line
 S3, a Rhein-Neckar S-Bahn line
 S3, a Rostock S-Bahn line
 S3, a Stuttgart S-Bahn line
 S3, a S-Bahn Steiermark line

Cars
 Audi S3, a version of the Audi A3 small family car
 Bentley S3, a four-door luxury car produced by Bentley from late 1962 until 1965
 Luxgen S3, a sedan produced by Taiwanese-based manufacturer Luxgen starting from 2016
 S3 Roadster, a car produced by South African-based manufacturer Birkin Cars

Roads
 S3 Shanghai–Fengxian Highway, a planned expressway in Shanghai, China
 S-3 Strategic Highway, operated by the Pakistan Ministry of Defence; see National Highways of Pakistan (even though it is not actually a National Highway)
 Expressway S3 (Poland), a major road in Poland
 California County Route S3, from State Route 78 to Borrego Springs over the Yaqui Pass; see California county routes in zone S

Others
 Stagecoach Gold bus route S3, a bus route in Oxfordshire, England
 AJS S3 V-twin, a British motorcycle

Organizations
 Swiss Space Systems (S-3), an aerospace company in Switzerland
 S3 Safe Sex Store, an assumed name of Michigan corporation BAK
 SThree, a British recruitment agency

Military
 S3 (missile), a French nuclear missile now out of commission
 Lockheed S-3 Viking, an American anti-submarine aircraft developed in the 1970s
 S.3 Springbok, a British aerial reconnaissance aircraft of the 1920s; see Short Springbok
 USS S-3 (SS-107), a U.S. Navy submarine
 Norrland Signal Battalion, designation S 3, a Swedish signal unit
 S3, the operations officer in military units; see Staff (military)

Science and technology
 Trisulfur, chemical formula (S3), an allotrope of sulfur
 S-phrase 3, also referred to as S3, "Keep in a cool place", a safety phrase in chemistry; see List of S-phrases
 British NVC community S3, Carex paniculata swamp; see Swamps and tall-herb fens in the British National Vegetation Classification system

Computing
 S3 Graphics, a computer-hardware company
 S3 Group, an Irish software company
 S3 Texture Compression, a group of lossy texture compression algorithms
 Amazon S3, also known as Amazon Simple Storage Service, an online data-storage service
 S3 (programming language), a language used to write the VME operating system and much other system software on the ICL 2900 Series
 S3, a standby mode in the Advanced Configuration and Power Interface (ACPI) specification
 Snapdragon S3, a Qualcomm ARM system-on-a-chip; see List of Qualcomm Snapdragon systems-on-chip

Electronics
 Canon PowerShot S3 IS, a 2006 digital camera; see Canon PowerShot S
 FinePix S3 Pro, a 2004 interchangeable lens digital single-lens reflex camera by Fujifilm 
 Infinix Hot S3, a smartphone released in 2018
 Nikon S3, a 1953 35 mm film camera
 Nikon Coolpix S3, a digital camera
 Samsung Galaxy S III, or Samsung Galaxy S3, a smartphone: the successor to the Samsung Galaxy S II
 Samsung Galaxy S III Mini, or Samsung Galaxy S3 Mini, the mini version of the Samsung Galaxy S III
 Samsung Galaxy Tab S3, an Android tablet 
 Samsung Gear S3, a 2016 smartwatch
 Samsung YP-S3, often referred to as the Samsung S3, an MP3 Player
 Siemens S3, a Siemens Mobile phone

Mathematics
 S3, the symmetric group of degree 3; see Dihedral group of order 6
 S3, the 3-sphere (a 3-manifold in four-dimensional space)

Medicine and anatomy
 Sacral spinal nerve 3, a spinal nerve of the sacral segment
 Third heart sound, or S3, a rare extra heart sound
 ATC code S03, Ophthalmological and otological preparations, a subgroup of the Anatomical Therapeutic Chemical Classification System

Other uses
 S3 Asia MBA, a selective dual-degree, tri-city, tri-university global MBA program
 S3 (classification), a classification for swimmers based on their level of disability
 Form S-3, a registration form used by the U.S. Securities and Exchange Commission
 Postcode district S3, part of the S postcode area of the UK, covering part of Sheffield
 Third year, also known as S3, Scottish secondary education for pupils aged about 14

See also
 3S (disambiguation)
 Schedule 3 (disambiguation)